Alex De Jong (born 1967) is a journalist living in London. He is a recognized presenter on CNBC EMEA, and most recently with the long-running series Healthy Horizons. He is known for his sarcastic wit.

Life and career
Alex began his journalist career in New Zealand working as a presenter/producer  TV3's late night programme "nightline"; he was "discovered" by Bill Ralston when he was MC at a graduation dinner in January 1995 at the Auckland Institute of Technology journalism school. He went on to work in similar roles for TV NZ and Sky TV in New Zealand before emigrating to London in September 2000.
 
Alex was one of the first broadcast reporters on the scene in London’s 7 July terrorist bombings, single-handedly filming and interviewing those caught up in the attack. He’s filed stories on topics as diverse as winemaking in Georgia, to economic reform in Mexico.   However, his true passion is sport, and during his career, he is reported at events ranging from the World Cup, to the Tour de France and the Olympic Games.

References

1967 births
New Zealand journalists
Living people